Baroness Sidonie Nádherná of Borutín, later Countess Sidonie of Thun und Hohenstein (1 December 1885 – 30 September 1950) was a Czech baroness known for hosting literary salons and her correspondence with Rainer Maria Rilke and Karl Kraus.

Life 
Sidonie Amálie Vilemína Karolína Julie Marie Nádherná of Borutín was the youngest child of landowner Karel Boromejský Jan Ludvík (1849–1895), Baron Nádherný of Borutín, and his wife Baroness Amalie Klein von Wisenberg (1854–1910), a daughter of the businessman Baron Albert Klein von Wisenberg. Her older brothers were Jan Karel Ludvík Sidonius Adalbert Julius Otmar Maria and Karel Maria Ludvík Hubert Adalbert Nádherný of Borutín.

Nádherná gained literary fame through her friendship with the poet Rainer Maria Rilke, with whom she corresponded from 1906 until his death in 1926, and her friendship and later romantic relationship with the writer Karl Kraus. Nádherná met Kraus on 8 September 1913, in Vienna's Café Imperial. Their relationship, often filled with intensity and conflict, lasted until his death in 1936. Kraus would likely have married her, but Rilke objected to Kraus' "unrepeatable difference" (a reference to his Jewish heritage).

In 1914, Nádherná sought to make an influential marriage to a count that could have helped hinder World War I. She reconciled with Kraus in 1915, who wrote much of his drama The Last Days of Humanity at her residence, castle in Vrchotovy Janovice, but they separated again at the end of the war. In 1920, Nádherná married the Austrian physician, Count Maximilian von Thun und Hohenstein (1887–1935) at Heiligenkreuz Abbey, but the relationship did not last. They separated a year later, and divorced in 1933. Nádherná and Kraus reunited and split several more times, eventually reconciling one last time in 1927, although their relationship was no longer romantic.

Sidonie von Nádherná's correspondence with Rilke and Kraus, now published, reveals her significance as a discussion partner, "creative listener," and as a representative of late Habsburg culture.

Nádherná is not solely defined by her relationships with influential men; she was also an independent and culturally invested woman. She organized many political and cultural salons at her family's estate near Prague. In addition to Rilke and Kraus, her circle also included the architect Adolf Loos, the writer Karel Čapek, the composer Dora Pejačević, and the painter Max Švabinský.

In 1942, Janowitz Castle was seized by German troops and converted into the SS-Truppenübungsplatz Böhmen, training grounds for the Waffen-SS. After the war, Nádherná tried to reclaim her family's property, but was unsuccessful. The castle continued to be used by the army, and in 1948 was confiscated by the Communist Party of Czechoslovakia. Nádherná was briefly arrested before fleeing to Great Britain through Bavaria. In 1950 she died impoverished while still in exile.

In 1999, Nádherná's remains were brought back to Janovice Castle and buried on the grounds. The castle and its surrounding lands were restored between 2000 and 2007, in a cooperative effort between the Czech Republic and Germany. Today it has become a cultural and scientific meeting place, much as it was during Nádherná's lifetime.

Literature

Biography 
 Alena Wagnerová: Das Leben der Sidonie Nádherný. Eine Biographie. Europäische Verlagsanstalt, Hamburg 2003, .

Correspondence 
 Elke Lorenz: Sei Ich ihr, sei mein Bote'. Der Briefwechsel zwischen Sidonie Nádherný und Albert Bloch, Iudicium, Munich 2002,  (German / English).
 Karl Kraus: Briefe an Sidonie Nádherný von Borutin. 1913–1936, 2 volumes, published by Friedrich Pfäfflin, Wallstein, Göttingen 2005, .
 Rainer Maria Rilke – Sidonie Nádherný von Borutin, Briefwechsel 1906–1926, published by Joachim W. Storck in collaboration with Waltraud und Friedrich Pfäfflin, Wallstein, Göttingen 2007, .
 Friedrich Pfäfflin, Alena Wagnerová (ed.): Gartenschönheit oder Die Zerstörung von Mitteleuropa: Sidonie Nádherný – Briefe an Václav Wagner 1942–1949 Wallstein, Göttingen 2015, .

References

External links 

 
 Brenner Archive of the University of Innsbruck
 
 "Komm zu mir, bis Du frei bist", letters from Karl Kraus to Sidonie Nádherná von Borutin, Die Zeit, 1 February 1974. 

Czech nobility
Bohemian nobility
20th-century letter writers
Women letter writers
1885 births
1950 deaths
German-language writers
European salon-holders
Czechoslovak emigrants to the United Kingdom
People from Benešov District